"643 (Love's on Fire)" is a single which appeared in DJ Tiësto first album, In My Memory titled as "Flight 643" and was later adapted with vocals by Suzanne Palmer. A megamix was released, just like "Lethal Industry"'s Lethal Edit, the track includes remixes by Oliver Klein, Oliver Lieb, Orkidea, Quivver, and Richard Durand. "643 (Love's On Fire)" also appears on the Disc 2 of the DJ Tiësto's album In My Memory.

Formats and track listings

CD, Maxi Singles
Netherlands, Scandinavia Maxi Single
 "643 (Love's On Fire)" (Radio Edit) - 2:49
 "643 (Love's On Fire)" (Oliver Klein Vox Mix) - 6:52
 "643 (Love's On Fire)" (Oliver Lieb Vocal Remix) - 7:49
 "643 (Love's On Fire)" (Oliver Lieb Vocal Remix) - 7:47
 "643 (Love's On Fire)" (Quivver Vocal Mix) - 7:46

VC Recordings Maxi Single
 "643 (Love's On Fire)" (Radio Edit) - 2:51
 "643 (Love's On Fire)" (Oliver Klein Vocal Mix) - 6:50
 "643 (Love's On Fire)" (Oliver Lieb Vocal Remix) - 4:44
 "643 (Love's On Fire)" (Quivver Vocal Remix) - 5:25
 "643 (Love's On Fire)" (video) (2:47) 

Nettwerk America Maxi Single
 "643 (Love's On Fire)" (Oliver Klein Vocal Mix) - 6:50
 "643 (Love's On Fire)" (Oliver Lieb Vocal Remix) - 4:44
 "643 (Love's On Fire)" (Quivver Vocal Remix) - 5:25

12" Vinyl

Magik Muzik 12" Vinyl
 "643 (Love's On Fire)" (Oliver Klein Vox Mix) - 6:52
 "643 (Love's On Fire)" (Quivver Vocal Remix) - 7:46
 "643 (Love's On Fire)" (Oliver Lieb Vocal Mix) - 7:49
 "643 (Love's On Fire)" (Oliver Lieb Instrumental) - 7:47

VC Recordings 12" Vinyl
 "643 (Love's On Fire)" (Megamix) - 14:05
 "Flight 643" (Original Mix) - 5:46
 "Flight 643" (video)

VC Recordings 12" Vinyl
 "643 (Love's On Fire)" (Quivver Instrumental Mix)

VC Recordings 12" Vinyl
 "643 (Love's On Fire)" (Oliver Klein Vox Mix) - 8:57
 "643 (Love's On Fire)" (Quivver Vocal Remix) - 7:38

Magik Muzik 12" Vinyl
 "643 (Love's On Fire)" (Radio Edit) - 2:49
 "643 (Love's On Fire)" (Oliver Klein Vox Mix) - 6:52

VC Recordings 12" Vinyl
 "643 (Love's On Fire)" (Radio Edit) - 2:50

VC Recordings 12" Vinyl
 "643 (Love's On Fire)" (Oliver Lieb Vocal Mix) - 4:44
 "643 (Love's On Fire)" (Oliver Lieb Instrumental)

VC Recordings 12" Vinyl
 "643 (Love's On Fire)" (Oliver Klein Vocal Mix) - 6:52
 "643 (Love's On Fire)" (Oliver Lieb Vocal Remix) - 7:49
 "643 (Love's On Fire)" (Quivver Vocal Remix) - 7:46

Charts

Official versions
 Radio Edit (2:51)
 Megamix (14:05)
 Oliver Klein Vocal Mix (6:50)
 Oliver Lieb Vocal Remix (7:47)
 Oliver Lieb Instrumental (7:49)
 Quivver Vocal Remix (7:38)
 Quivver Instrumental Mix

Release history

References

Tiësto songs
2001 songs
2002 singles
Songs written by Tiësto